Gaik Kazazian (born 1982) is an Armenian violinist, laureate of the III prize of the Henryk Wieniawski Violin Competition in 2001.

Awards
"The winner of the first premium of Republican competition of violinists (1994)"
"The owner of the Gold medal and Grand Prix of competition of violinists Amadeus-95 (Belgium)"
"The owner of a special prize " For masterly execution " at the International competition of violinists in Germany (1997)"
Winner - "Wieniawski Competition in Poznan (2001)"
Winner - "Marguerite Long and Jacques Thibaud Competition in Paris (2002)"
"Awarded by Gold Medal and Audience Choice Prize at the violinist’s competition in Switzerland (2004)"
Winner - "Paganini Competition in Moscow (2005)"
Winner - "Gold Medal and Audience Choice Prize at the violinist’s competition in Tongyong (South Korea, 2007)"
Laureate of Tchaikovsky Competition ( 3rd prize ) in 2015

References

External links 
Gaik Kazazain at IMG artists

Armenian violinists
Henryk Wieniawski Violin Competition prize-winners
1982 births
Living people
21st-century violinists